Gregory J. W. Urwin (born July 11, 1955) is a professor of military history at Temple University and the author of several books and articles. He has been at Temple University since 1999. His wife Cathy Kunzinger Urwin is also a professor and author. She wrote Agenda for Reform: Winthrop Rockefeller as Governor of Arkansas, 1967–1971, University of Arkansas Press, 1991. He is a contributing author to Encyclopædia Britannica. He received the General Wallace M. Greene Jr. Award from the Marine Corps Heritage Foundation and the Harold L. Peterson Award from the Eastern National Park and Monuments Association. He has appeared in documentaries and given public lectures.

He was born in Cleveland and graduated from Borromeo Seminary High School in 1973. He graduated summa cum laude from Borromeo College of Ohio in 1977, received a Master of Arts degree from John Carroll University in 1979, and earned a Master of Arts from the University of Notre Dame  in 1981. He also received a Ph.D. from Notre Dame. He wrote his doctoral dissertation on “The Defenders on Wake Island".

Urwin taught at St. Mary of the Plains College in Dodge City, Kansas and the University of Central Arkansas before joining Temple University's history department.

Bibliography
Custer Victorious: The Civil War Battles of General George Armstrong Custer. Rutherford, Teaneck, and Madison, New Jersey, Fairleigh Dickinson University Press, 1983
Facing Fearful Odds: The Siege of Wake Island, University of Nebraska Press, Lincoln, 1997; won the General Wallace M. Greene Jr. Award in 1998 from the Marine Corps Heritage Foundation
History of the 33d Iowa Infantry Volunteer Regiment 1863–6. by A. F. Sperry, University of Arkansas Press, Fayetteville, 1999
Black Flag over Dixie: Racial Atrocities and Reprisals in the Civil War, editor, Southern Illinois University Press, Carbondale, 2004
Victory in Defeat: The Wake Island Defenders in Captivity, 1941-1945, Naval Institute Press, Annapolis, 2010.
"Custer: The Civil War Years", in The Custer Reader edited by Paul A. Hutton, University of Nebraska Press, Lincoln 1992, pages 7–32.
"'We Cannot Treat Negroes . . . as Prisoners of War’: Racial Atrocities and Reprisals in Civil War Arkansas”, Civil War History 42, September 1996, pages 193–210, won the  Harold L. Peterson Award in 1997 from the Eastern National Park and Monument Association
Glory and Me: A History Professor's Short Love/Hate Affair with Hollywood,” North and South: The Official Magazine of the Civil War Society, 11, October 2009, pages 49–57.

References

External links
 C-Span 3 American History TV. Philadelphia - Museum of the American Revolution. Talk by Professor Gregory Urwin, of Temple University, Doylestown on 4 October 2019

1955 births
Temple University faculty
Living people
Contributors to the Encyclopædia Britannica
Writers from Cleveland
John Carroll University alumni
University of Notre Dame alumni
St. Mary of the Plains College
University of Central Arkansas faculty
Academics from Ohio